Lu Lun (739–799) was a Chinese poet of the Middle Tang dynasty, with six of his poems being included in the famous anthology Three Hundred Tang Poems, as well as being mentioned in one poem, by Sikong Shu, which was translated by Witter Bynner as "When Lu Lun My Cousin Comes For The Night". His courtesy name is Yun Yan.

Biography
Lu Lun was born around 748. His ancestral home was Fanyang, now in modern southwest Beijing, China. He was born in what is now  Yongji, Shanxi.

He was prevented from assuming his governmental appointment, following his receiving the Jinshi degree in the Imperial examination system, by the disorders associated with the An Shi Rebellion, which caused him to flee for refuge to Jiangxi.

He died around 799.

Poetry
As a poet, Lu Lun is known for continuing the Frontier fortress genre of Tang poetry (along with Li Yi), begun earlier by the  "Borders and Frontier Fortress Poets Group" (边塞诗派), in which are included Gao Shi, Cen Can, Wang Changling, Wang Zhihuan, Cui Hao, and Li Qi. Indeed, out of the six lyrics of Lu's included in the Tang 300, four of them are variations written under the title of "Beyond the Border Tunes" (塞下曲).

See also

Tang poetry
Classical Chinese poetry
Classical Chinese poetry genres

References

Cited works

External links 
Books of the Quan Tangshi that include collected poems of Lu Lun at the Chinese Text Project:
Book 276
Book 277
Book 278
Book 279
Book 280
 

Three Hundred Tang Poems poets
739 births
799 deaths
People from Yuncheng
Poets from Shanxi
8th-century Chinese poets
Lu clan of Fanyang